M. C. Narasimhan (died 10 June 2020) was an Indian communist politician and trade unionist and leader of Communist Party of India.  He worked for the cause of mine workers at Kolar Gold Fields and was elected MLA from there in 1957. He also was member at Karnataka Legislative Council.

References

20th-century births
2020 deaths
Communist Party of India politicians from Karnataka
Trade unionists from Karnataka
Year of birth missing
Place of birth missing
People from Kolar district
All India Trade Union Congress
Karnataka politicians